2020 Alabama Amendment 1, the Citizen Requirement for Voting Measure, was a legislatively referred constitutional amendment decided on November 3, 2020, as part of the 2020 Alabama elections. The amendment passed with 77.01% of the vote.

Contents
The proposal appeared on the ballot as follows:

Results

The amendment was approved with 77.01% of the vote.

See also
 2020 Florida Amendment 1

References

2020
Alabama
amendments
Citizen Requirement for Voting